Muscoe Russell Hunter Garnett (July 25, 1821 – February 14, 1864), was a nineteenth-century politician and lawyer from Virginia.

Early life
Garnett was born on his family’s "Elmwood" estate located near Loretto, Virginia. He was the son of James Mercer Garnett and Maria (née Hunter) Garnett, and born into the First Families of Virginia.

His grandfather James M. Garnett and aunts raised him after his father died in 1824. He received a private education suitable to his class. His uncle was a congressman Robert Garnett Robert Mercer Taliaferro Hunter. He attended the University of Virginia, where he received his law degree in 1842. Garnett was admitted to the Virginia bar in 1842, and set up practice, as his father had done, in Loretto.

Career
He was a delegate to the Virginia Constitutional Convention in 1850 and 1851 where he opposed expansion of the electorate, fearing internal improvements that would benefit western counties.  In 1850, he wrote a pamphlet The Union, Past and Future; how it works and how to save it. By a Citizen of Virginia, which discussed the relationship of slavery to the national government.

Prior to his election to Congress, he was a Virginia delegate to both the 1852 and 1856 Democratic National Conventions, a member of the Virginia House of Delegates (from 1853–1856), and a member of the Board of Visitors of the University of Virginia (from 1855–1859).

In 1856, Garnett was elected as a Democrat from Virginia's 1st Congressional District to the 34th Congress to fill the vacancy caused by the death of Thomas H. Bayly. He was subsequently reelected to both the 35th and 36th Congresses, serving from December 1, 1856, to March 3, 1861, only leaving at the outbreak of the Civil War.

With his sympathies lying with the South, he became a delegate to first the Virginia secession convention and then to the State constitutional convention in 1861. From 1862–1864, he was a Virginian member of the First Confederate Congress.  During that same time, his uncle Robert Hunter was the CSA Secretary of State and then a CSA Senator.

Personal life
He was married on July 26, 1860, to Mary Picton Stevens (1840-1903), a daughter of Edwin Augustus Stevens. They had two children before his early death:

 James Mercer Garnett, who was born July 7, 1861.
 Mary Barton Picton Garnett, who was born May 28, 1863.

While attending the Confederate Congress in early 1864, Muscoe caught typhoid fever, and subsequently died at his family's "Elmwood" estate on February 14, 1864, where he was buried in the family cemetery.  After his death, his widow married Edward Parke Custis Lewis, a diplomat, who was a descendant of George Washington.

"Elmwood" was listed on the National Register of Historic Places in 1970.

Elections
1856; Garnett was first elected to the U.S. House of Representatives in a special election with 51.58% of the vote, defeating American Robert Saunders.
1857; Garnett was re-elected with 57.08% of the vote, defeating American John Critcher.
1859; Garnett was re-elected unopposed.

References

External links

1821 births
1864 deaths
Democratic Party members of the Virginia House of Delegates
Virginia lawyers
University of Virginia School of Law alumni
Virginia Secession Delegates of 1861
Members of the Confederate House of Representatives from Virginia
People from Essex County, Virginia
Deaths from typhoid fever
Democratic Party members of the United States House of Representatives from Virginia
Infectious disease deaths in Virginia
19th-century American politicians
19th-century American lawyers
Garnett family of Virginia